Arroyo Calabasas (also known as Calabasas Creek) is a  tributary of the Los Angeles River, in the southwestern San Fernando Valley area of Los Angeles County in California.

Route

The stream begins with the merging of: Dry Canyon Creek from a Santa Monica Mountains  watershed and McCoy Canyon Creek from a Simi Hills (Hidden Hills and Upper Las Virgenes Canyon Open Space Preserve) watershed, near the Leonis Adobe in the town of Calabasas.

Arroyo Calabasas flows northeast through Woodland Hills and Canoga Park.  In Canoga Park it joins Bell Creek, directly east of Canoga Park High School beside Vanowen Avenue. The confluence marks the "headwaters" of the Los Angeles River, .

The flow of Arroyo Calabasas is entirely encased in a concrete flood control channel.

Crossings
From mouth to source (year built in parentheses):

Vanowen Street (1964)
Westfield Topanga Parking Lot (1964)
California State Route 27 - North Topanga Canyon Boulevard (1962)
Kittridge Street [Pedestrian Bridge]
Victory Boulevard (1966)
Sylvan Street [Private Pedestrian Bridge]
Shoup Avenue (1964)
Oxnard Street (1963)
Fallbrook Avenue (1961)
Burbank Boulevard (1968)
Woodlake Avenue (1968)
Mariano Street (1968)
Canzonet Street (1968)
Dry Canyon Creek enters from south
Valley Circle Boulevard (1962)
McCoy Canyon Creek enters from west

See also

Source (river or stream) - a.k.a. watershed and headwaters
Confluence - a.k.a. "headwaters"
Drainage basin - a.k.a. "watershed"

References

Rivers of Los Angeles County, California
Tributaries of the Los Angeles River
Geography of the San Fernando Valley
Geography of Los Angeles
Santa Monica Mountains
Calabasas, California
Canoga Park, Los Angeles
Woodland Hills, Los Angeles
Rivers of Southern California